Spergularia canadensis is a species of flowering plant in the family Caryophyllaceae, known by the common name Canadian sandspurry. It is native to North America, where it is known from mainly coastal habitat. It is found along the coastline of Canada and northern parts of the United States, from Alaska to northern California on the West Coast, and as far south as New York on the East Coast.

This is a plant of wet, often saline substrates, such as beaches, salt marshes, and brackish estuaries. It is an annual herb producing a slender or thick stem up to 25 centimeters long, which is lined with fleshy linear leaves up to 4.5 centimeters long. Flowers occur in an inflorescence at the end of the stem, as well as in leaf axils. The small flowers have five pointed sepals, and five oval white or pink petals. The fruit is a capsule containing shiny reddish brown seeds.

References

External links
Calflora Database: Spergularia canadensis  (Canadian sandspurry)
Jepson Manual eFlora (TJM2) treatment of Spergularia canadensis var. occidentalis
USDA Plants Profile for Spergularia canadensis
Flora of North America

canadensis
Flora of Canada
Flora of the Northwestern United States
Flora of the North-Central United States
Flora of the Northeastern United States
Flora of Alaska
Flora of California
Flora without expected TNC conservation status